Leechia bilinealis is a moth in the family Crambidae. It was described by South in 1901. It is found in Hubei in China and in Japan.

References

Moths described in 1901
Schoenobiinae